Eric R. Yost (born September 4, 1955) is a former American politician, attorney and judge from Kansas. He served in both houses of the state legislature, as a judge, and as a county counselor before resigning in the face of an ethics investigation.

Yost was born in Wichita, Kansas and attended local schools. He went to Wichita State University as an undergraduate, studying journalism.

After graduating from Wichita State, Yost was elected to the Kansas House of Representatives in 1978. He was re-elected in 1980, ultimately serving two terms in the House. In 1982, he left the House to attend the University of Kansas School of Law, and he was elected to the Kansas State Senate from the 30th district in 1984.

Yost served two terms in the state senate, and made an unsuccessful run for Kansas's 4th congressional district in 1992. In 1997, he was elected as a district judge for Sedgwick County, and he spent nearly two decades there, leaving his judgeship in 2015 to become county counselor for Sedgwick County.

In 2018, disputes erupted over a Federal Bureau of Investigation inquiry into alleged illegal behavior by several county commissioners regarding the firing of County Manager Mike Scholes. Yost was accused of violating attorney-client confidentiality and faced ethics charges. He closed his law office on September 2, 2022.

References

1955 births
Living people
Republican Party Kansas state senators
Republican Party members of the Kansas House of Representatives
Politicians from Wichita, Kansas
20th-century American politicians
20th-century American judges
21st-century American judges
Kansas state court judges
County officials in Kansas
Wichita State University alumni
University of Kansas School of Law alumni